American singer Kane Brown has released three studio albums, three extended plays, fourteen singles, and twenty three music videos.

Studio albums

Extended plays

Singles

Other charted songs

Featured charted songs

Music videos

Notes

References

External links 

Kane Brown profile on AllMusic

Discographies of American artists
Country music discographies